Sean Hornbuckle (born September 2, 1985) is an American politician who has served in the West Virginia House of Delegates from the 16th district since 2014.

References

1985 births
Living people
Marshall University alumni
Democratic Party members of the West Virginia House of Delegates
Politicians from Huntington, West Virginia
21st-century American politicians